The 1908 United States presidential election in Vermont took place on November 3, 1908 as part of the 1908 United States presidential election. Voters chose four representatives, or electors to the Electoral College, who voted for president and vice president.

Vermont overwhelmingly voted for the Republican nominee, Secretary of War William Howard Taft, over the Democratic nominee, former U.S. Representative William Jennings Bryan. Taft won Vermont by a landslide margin of 53.26%.

With 75.08% of the popular vote, Vermont would be Taft’s strongest victory in terms of percentage in the popular vote.

Results

Results by county

See also
 United States presidential elections in Vermont

References

Vermont
1908
1908 Vermont elections